Union Township is located in Livingston County, Illinois. As of the 2010 census, its population was 240 and it contained 98 housing units. Union Township formed from Odell Township in 1864.

Geography

Demographics

References

External links
US Census
City-data.com
Illinois State Archives

Townships in Livingston County, Illinois
Populated places established in 1864
Townships in Illinois
1864 establishments in Illinois